An ogre (feminine: ogress) is a legendary monster depicted as a large, hideous, man-like being that eats ordinary human beings, especially infants and children. Ogres frequently feature in mythology, folklore, and fiction throughout the world. They appear in many classic works of literature, and are most often associated in fairy tales and legend with a taste for infants.

In mythology, ogres are often depicted as inhumanly large, tall, and having a disproportionately large head, abundant hair, unusually colored skin, a voracious appetite, and a strong body. Ogres are closely linked with giants and with human cannibals in mythology. In both folklore and fiction, giants are often given ogrish traits (such as the giants in "Jack and the Beanstalk" and "Jack the Giant Killer", the Giant Despair in The Pilgrim's Progress, and the Jötunn of Norse mythology); while ogres may be given giant-like traits.

Famous examples of ogres in folklore include the ogre in "Puss in Boots" and the ogre in "Hop-o'-My-Thumb". Other characters sometimes described as ogres include the title character from "Bluebeard", the Beast from Beauty and the Beast, Humbaba from the Epic of Gilgamesh, Grendel from Beowulf, Polyphemus the Cyclops from Homer's Odyssey, the man-eating giant in "Sinbad the Sailor", the oni of Japanese folklore and the ghouls of pre-Islamic Arabian religion.

Etymology 

The word ogre is of French origin, originally derived from the Etruscan god Orcus, who fed on human flesh. Its earliest attestation is in Chrétien de Troyes' late 12th-century verse romance Perceval, li contes del graal, which contains the lines:

The ogres in this rhyme may refer to the ogres who were, in the pseudohistorical work History of the Kings of Britain by Geoffrey of Monmouth, the inhabitants of Britain prior to human settlement. The Italian author Giambattista Basile (1575–1632) used the related Neapolitan word uerco, or in standard Italian, orco in some of his tales. This word is documented in earlier Italian works (Fazio degli Uberti, 14th century; Luigi Pulci, 15th century; Ludovico Ariosto, 15th–16th centuries) and has even older cognates with the Latin orcus and the Old English orcnēas found in Beowulf lines 112–113, which inspired J.R.R. Tolkien's Orc. All these words may derive from a shared Indo-European mythological concept (as Tolkien himself speculated, as cited by Tom Shippey, The Road to Middle-earth, 45). The Dictionary of the Academy of France alternatively states that the name is derived from the word Hongrois, which means Hungarian, as of western cultures referred to Hungarians as a kind of monstrosity. Ogre could possibly also derive from the biblical Og, last of the giants (or from the Greek river god Oiagros, father of Orpheus).

The word ogre came into wider usage in the works of Charles Perrault (1628–1703) or Marie-Catherine Jumelle de Berneville, Comtesse d' Aulnoy (1650–1705), both of whom were French authors. The first appearance of the word ogre in Perrault's work occurred in his Histoires ou Contes du temps Passé (1696). It later appeared in several of his other fairy tales, many of which were based on the Neapolitan tales of Basile. The first example of a female ogre being referred to as an ogress is found in his version of Sleeping Beauty, where it is spelled ogresse. Madame d'Aulnoy first employed the word ogre in her story L'Orangier et l'Abeille (1698), and was the first to use the word ogree to refer to the creature's offspring.

Fairy tales that feature ogres 

 Hop-o'-My-Thumb
 Puss in Boots
 Sleeping Beauty
 The Bee and the Orange Tree
 Finette Cendron or Cunning Cinders
 Bearskin
 Tale of the Ogre
 The Flea
 The Enchanted Doe
 Violet
 The Dove
 Corvetto
 The Three Crowns
 Liisa and the Prince
 The Selfish Giant
 Garulfo

Gallery

In illustration

In sculpture

See also

Buggane
Cyclopes
Darkspawn
Daeva
Fictional ogres (category)
Giant
Goliath
Humbaba
Jinn
Ghoul
Jötunn
Ke'let
Mapinguari
Oni
Orc
Rakshasa
Shrek
Stallo
Troll
Wendigo

References
Rose, Carol. Giants, Monsters, & Dragons: An Encyclopedia of Folklore, Legend, and Myth. New York: W. W. Norton & Company, 2001. 
Shippey, Tom. The Road to Middle-earth. London: HarperCollins, 1992 (rev.). 
South, Malcolm, ed. Mythical and Fabulous Creatures: A Source Book and Research Guide. Westport, CT: Greenwood Press, 1987. Reprint, New York: Peter Bedrick Books, 1988. 
Kathrine Mary Briggs The Fairies in Tradition and Literature 
"Ogre." Encyclopædia Britannica. 2006. Encyclopædia Britannica Online. 15 May 2006, search.eb.com

Notes

External links

 
Mythological monsters
Supernatural legends
English legendary creatures
Medieval European legendary creatures
Mythic humanoids
French legendary creatures
Italian legendary creatures